Parashuram Krishnaji Sawant (also known as Balasaheb Sawant) was an Indian politician. He served as Chief Minister of Maharashtra from 25 November 1963 to 4 December 1963, in an interim capacity for nine days following the death of his predecessor, Marotrao Kannamwar. Until Devendra Fadnavis' second government in 2019, this was shortest ministry tenure in Maharashtra.

Prior to becoming Chief Minister, Sawant was the state's home minister under Kannamwar. He represented Vengurla in the erstwhile Bombay Legislative Assembly from 1952 to 1957, and Chiplun in the Maharashtra Legislative Assembly from 1962 to 1978.

The agricultural university at Dapoli was renamed Dr. Balasaheb Sawant Konkan Krishi Vidyapeeth after Sawant in 2001.

See also
 P.K. Sawant on Marathi Wikipedia

References

Chief Ministers of Maharashtra
Chief ministers from Indian National Congress